Martin Kučera (born 10 May 1990 in Bratislava) is a Slovak athlete specialising in the 400 metres hurdles. He won the gold medal at the 2013 Summer Universiade.

His personal best in the event is 49.08 seconds set in Amsterdam in 2016.

International competitions

References

External links 
 Martin Kučera at the Slovenský Olympijský Výbor 
 

1990 births
Living people
Slovak male hurdlers
Athletes (track and field) at the 2015 European Games
Athletes (track and field) at the 2016 Summer Olympics
Olympic athletes of Slovakia
Sportspeople from Bratislava
Universiade medalists in athletics (track and field)
Universiade gold medalists for Slovakia
European Games silver medalists for Slovakia
European Games medalists in athletics
Athletes (track and field) at the 2019 European Games
Medalists at the 2013 Summer Universiade